Jericho Friends Meeting House Complex is a historic Quaker meeting house complex located at 6 Old Jericho Turnpike in Jericho, Nassau County, New York.  The complex consists of the meetinghouse (1788), former Friends' schoolhouse (1793), a large gable roofed shed (ca. 1875), and the Friends' cemetery.  The meeting house is a two-story, gable roofed timber-framed structure clad in wood shingles.  One of the people who helped build the meeting house was preacher Elias Hicks (1748 – 1830), who is buried at the cemetery within the complex.

It was listed on the National Register of Historic Places in 2002.

References

Churches on the National Register of Historic Places in New York (state)
Churches in Nassau County, New York
Quaker meeting houses in New York (state)
National Register of Historic Places in Nassau County, New York